The 1953–54 Montreal Canadiens season was the 45th season in franchise history. The team placed second in the regular season to qualify for the playoffs. The Canadiens lost in Stanley Cup final against Detroit Red Wings 4 games to 3.

Pre-season
"Punch Line" center Elmer Lach retired.

Regular season

Final standings

Record vs. opponents

Schedule and results

Playoffs

Stanley Cup Finals

Player statistics

Regular season
Scoring

Goaltending

Playoffs
Scoring

Goaltending

Awards and records

Transactions

See also
 1953–54 NHL season

References
Canadiens on Hockey Database
Canadiens on NHL Reference

Montreal Canadiens seasons
Mon
Mon
Montreal Canadiens
Montreal Canadiens